Chung Chung-hoon (born June 15, 1970) is a South Korean cinematographer and filmmaker, best known for his collaborations with director Park Chan-wook. He is also known for his other work in film and television, including Me and Earl and the Dying Girl, It, Zombieland: Double Tap, Last Night in Soho, Uncharted, and Obi-Wan Kenobi.

Early life
Chung was born in Seoul, South Korea. He attended Dongguk University in 1990, initially majoring in theater, and later switched his focus to cinematography. While attending Dongguk University, he directed three short films. During his senior year, he made his debut as cinematographer on a feature called Yuri.

Filmography

Film

Television

Music videos

References

External links
 

South Korean cinematographers
Dongguk University alumni
People from Seoul
1970 births
Living people